In mathematics, Frölicher spaces extend the notions of calculus and smooth manifolds. They were introduced in 1982 by the mathematician Alfred Frölicher.

Definition
A Frölicher space consists of a non-empty set X together with a subset C of Hom(R, X) called the set of smooth curves, and a subset F of Hom(X, R) called the set of smooth real functions, such that for each real function

f : X → R

in F and each curve

c : R → X

in C, the following axioms are satisfied:

 f in F if and only if for each γ in C, f . γ in C∞(R, R)
 c in C if and only if for each φ in F, φ . c in C∞(R, R)

Let A and B be two Frölicher spaces. A map

m : A → B

is called smooth if for each smooth curve c in CA, m.c is in CB. Furthermore, the space of all such smooth maps has itself the structure of a Frölicher space. The smooth functions on 

C∞(A, B)

are the images of

References 
 , section 23

Smooth functions
Structures on manifolds